John Bowman Duncan (December 7, 1923 – February 8, 2016) was an American actor. In addition to managing several business ventures, he made appearances at comic book conventions and collectors' shows worldwide.

Biography

Career
Johnny Duncan learned to dance Jitterbug as a teen and by the age of 19 had his first major appearance in a dance role in the "King of Swing" Benny Goodman camp classic musical The Gang's All Here. This kicked off Duncan's career as a movie swing dancer and actor and led to numerous appearances in other films, and a contract with 20th Century Fox, where he appeared in productions with Shirley Temple and Jane Withers. Notable roles include parts in The East Side Kids, The Bowery Boys, Mystery of the 13th Guest and the 1949 serial Batman and Robin as Dick Grayson / Robin, the Boy Wonder. He was so young looking that he was twenty-five years old when he was hired to play the Boy Wonder.

He later appeared in bit parts in a number of films including Plan 9 from Outer Space. He was a member of The Black Rebels Motorcycle Club in the classic Marlon Brando film The Wild One in 1952. His final film appearance was in the 1960 film Spartacus.

Personal life
Duncan made occasional appearances at movie conventions, often signing photos from The East Side Kids and Batman and Robin until his death in February 2016 at the age of 92.

Filmography

Film

Television

References

External links

Interview with Johnny Duncan
Website for Johnny Duncan (Now defunct after his passing)
NPR profile of Johnny Duncan

1923 births
2016 deaths
American male film actors